Suliman-Marlon Mustapha (born 24 May 2001) is an Austrian professional footballer who plays as a forward for German club Mainz 05.

Career
In 2021, Mustapha was sent on loan to Austrian side Admira Wacker from Mainz 05 in the German Bundesliga. On 24 July 2021, he debuted for Admira during a 1-1 draw with WSG Tirol.

References

External links

 Profile at the 1. FSV Mainz 05 website 
 
 

Austrian footballers
Austrian expatriate footballers
Expatriate footballers in Germany
Living people
2001 births
Austrian expatriate sportspeople in Germany
Association football forwards
Regionalliga players
Austrian Football Bundesliga players
1. FSV Mainz 05 players
1. FSV Mainz 05 II players
FC Admira Wacker Mödling players
Austria youth international footballers
Footballers from Vienna